The 1976 United States House of Representatives elections were elections for the United States House of Representatives on November 2, 1976, to elect members to serve in the 95th United States Congress. They coincided with Jimmy Carter's election as president. Carter's narrow victory over Gerald Ford had limited coattails, and his Democratic Party gained a net of only one seat from the Republican Party in the House. The result was nevertheless disappointing to the Republicans, who were hoping to win back some of the seats they lost in the wake of the Watergate scandal two years earlier. 

This election was the last time Democrats or any party had a two-thirds supermajority in the House. , this is the last congressional election in which Democrats won a House seat in Wyoming.

Overall results

Source: Election Statistics – Office of the Clerk

Special elections 

|-
! 
| James F. Hastings
|  | Republican
| 1968
|  | Incumbent resigned January 20, 1976 to become president of Associated Industries of New York State.New member elected March 2, 1976.Democratic gain.
| nowrap | 

|-
! 
| Robert R. Casey
|  | Democratic
| 1958
|  | Incumbent resigned January 22, 1976, to become commissioner to the United States Maritime Commission.New member elected April 3, 1976.Republican gain.Winner subsequently lost re-election in November, see below.
| nowrap | 

|-
! 
| Wright Patman
|  | Democratic
| 1928
|  | Incumbent died March 7, 1976.New member elected June 19, 1976.Democratic hold.
| 

|-
! 
| Jerry Litton
|  | Democratic
| 1972
|  | Incumbent died August 3, 1976.New member elected November 2, 1976.Republican gain.Winner was also elected to the next term, see below.
| nowrap | 

|-
! 
| Torbert Macdonald
|  | Democratic
| 1954
|  | Incumbent died May 21, 1976.New member elected November 2, 1976.Democratic hold.Winner was also elected to the next term, see below.
| nowrap | 

|-
! 
| William A. Barrett
|  | Democratic
| 19441946 1948
|  | Incumbent died April 12, 1976.New member elected November 2, 1976.Democratic hold.
| 

|}

Alabama 

|-
! 
| Jack Edwards
|  | Republican
| 1964
| Incumbent re-elected.
| nowrap | 

|-
! 
| William Louis Dickinson
|  | Republican
| 1964
| Incumbent re-elected.
| nowrap | 

|-
! 
| Bill Nichols
|  | Democratic
| 1966
| Incumbent re-elected.
| nowrap | 

|-
! 
| Tom Bevill
|  | Democratic
| 1966
| Incumbent re-elected.
| nowrap | 

|-
! 
| Robert E. Jones Jr.
|  | Democratic
| 1947 
|  | Incumbent retired.New member elected.Democratic hold.
| nowrap | 

|-
! 
| John Hall Buchanan Jr.
|  | Republican
| 1964
| Incumbent re-elected.
| nowrap | 

|-
! 
| Walter Flowers
|  | Democratic
| 1968
| Incumbent re-elected.
| nowrap | 

|}

Alaska 

|-
! 
| Don Young
|  | Republican
| 1973 
| Incumbent re-elected.
| nowrap | 

|}

Arizona 

|-
! 
| John Jacob Rhodes
|  | Republican
| 1952
| Incumbent re-elected.
| nowrap | 

|-
! 
| Mo Udall
|  | Democratic
| 1961 
| Incumbent re-elected.
| nowrap | 

|-
! 
| Sam Steiger
|  | Republican
| 1966
|  | Incumbent retired to run for U.S. senator.New member elected.Democratic gain.
| nowrap | 

|-
! 
| John Bertrand Conlan
|  | Republican
| 1972
|  | Incumbent retired to run for U.S. senator.New member elected.Republican hold.
| nowrap | 

|}

Arkansas 

|-
! 
| William Vollie Alexander Jr.
|  | Democratic
| 1968
| Incumbent re-elected.
| nowrap | 

|-
! 
| Wilbur Mills
|  | Democratic
| 1938
|  | Incumbent retired.New member elected.Democratic hold.
| nowrap | 

|-
! 
| John Paul Hammerschmidt
|  | Republican
| 1966
| Incumbent re-elected.
| nowrap | 

|-
! 
| Ray Thornton
|  | Democratic
| 1972
| Incumbent re-elected.
| nowrap | 

|}

California 

|-
! 
| Harold T. Johnson
|  | Democratic
| 1958
| Incumbent re-elected.
| nowrap | 

|-
! 
| Donald H. Clausen
|  | Republican
| 1963
| Incumbent re-elected.
| nowrap | 

|-
! 
| John E. Moss
|  | Democratic
| 1952
| Incumbent re-elected.
| nowrap | 

|-
! 
| Robert L. Leggett
|  | Democratic
| 1962
| Incumbent re-elected.
| nowrap | 

|-
! 
| John L. Burton
|  | Democratic
| 1974
| Incumbent re-elected.
| nowrap | 

|-
! 
| Phillip Burton
|  | Democratic
| 1964
| Incumbent re-elected.
| nowrap | 

|-
! 
| George Miller
|  | Democratic
| 1974
| Incumbent re-elected.
| nowrap | 

|-
! 
| Ron Dellums
|  | Democratic
| 1970
| Incumbent re-elected.
| nowrap | 

|-
! 
| Pete Stark
|  | Democratic
| 1972
| Incumbent re-elected.
| nowrap | 

|-
! 
| Don Edwards
|  | Democratic
| 1962
| Incumbent re-elected.
| nowrap | 

|-
! 
| Leo Ryan
|  | Democratic
| 1972
| Incumbent re-elected.
| nowrap | 

|-
! 
| Pete McCloskey
|  | Republican
| 1967
| Incumbent re-elected.
| nowrap | 

|-
! 
| Norman Mineta
|  | Democratic
| 1974
| Incumbent re-elected.
| nowrap | 

|-
! 
| John J. McFall
|  | Democratic
| 1956
| Incumbent re-elected.
| nowrap | 

|-
! 
| B. F. Sisk
|  | Democratic
| 1954
| Incumbent re-elected.
| nowrap | 

|-
! 
| Burt L. Talcott
|  | Republican
| 1962
|  | Lost re-electionDemocratic gain.
| nowrap | 

|-
! 
| John Hans Krebs
|  | Democratic
| 1974
| Incumbent re-elected.
| nowrap | 

|-
! 
| William M. Ketchum
|  | Republican
| 1972
| Incumbent re-elected.
| nowrap | 

|-
! 
| Robert J. Lagomarsino
|  | Republican
| 1974
| Incumbent re-elected.
| nowrap | 

|-
! 
| Barry Goldwater Jr.
|  | Republican
| 1969
| Incumbent re-elected.
| nowrap | 

|-
! 
| James C. Corman
|  | Democratic
| 1960
| Incumbent re-elected.
| nowrap | 

|-
! 
| Carlos Moorhead
|  | Republican
| 1972
| Incumbent re-elected.
| nowrap | 

|-
! 
| Thomas M. Rees
|  | Democratic
| 1965
|  | Incumbent retired.New member elected.Democratic hold.
| nowrap | 

|-
! 
| Henry Waxman
|  | Democratic
| 1974
| Incumbent re-elected.
| nowrap | 

|-
! 
| Edward R. Roybal
|  | Democratic
| 1962
| Incumbent re-elected.
| nowrap | 

|-
! 
| John H. Rousselot
|  | Republican
| 19601962 1970 
| Incumbent re-elected.
| nowrap | 

|-
! 
| Alphonzo E. Bell Jr.
|  | Republican
| 1960
|  | Incumbent retired to run for U.S. senator.New member elected.Republican hold.
| nowrap | 

|-
! 
| Yvonne Brathwaite Burke
|  | Democratic
| 1972
| Incumbent re-elected.
| nowrap | 

|-
! 
| Augustus Hawkins
|  | Democratic
| 1962
| Incumbent re-elected.
| nowrap | 

|-
! 
| George E. Danielson
|  | Democratic
| 1970
| Incumbent re-elected.
| nowrap | 

|-
! 
| Charles H. Wilson
|  | Democratic
| 1962
| Incumbent re-elected.
| nowrap | 

|-
! 
| Glenn M. Anderson
|  | Democratic
| 1968
| Incumbent re-elected.
| nowrap | 

|-
! 
| Del M. Clawson
|  | Republican
| 1963
| Incumbent re-elected.
| nowrap | 

|-
! 
| Mark W. Hannaford
|  | Democratic
| 1974
| Incumbent re-elected.
| nowrap | 

|-
! 
| James F. Lloyd
|  | Democratic
| 1974
| Incumbent re-elected.
| nowrap | 

|-
! 
| George Brown Jr.
|  | Democratic
| 19621970 1972
| Incumbent re-elected.
| nowrap | 

|-
! 
| Shirley Neil Pettis
|  | Republican
| 1975
| Incumbent re-elected.
| nowrap | 

|-
! 
| Jerry M. Patterson
|  | Democratic
| 1974
| Incumbent re-elected.
| nowrap | 

|-
! 
| Charles E. Wiggins
|  | Republican
| 1966
| Incumbent re-elected.
| nowrap | 

|-
! 
| Andrew J. Hinshaw
|  | Republican
| 1972
|  | Lost renominationRepublican hold.
| nowrap | 

|-
! 
| Bob Wilson
|  | Republican
| 1952
| Incumbent re-elected.
| nowrap | 

|-
! 
| Lionel Van Deerlin
|  | Democratic
| 1962
| Incumbent re-elected.
| nowrap | 

|-
! 
| Clair Burgener
|  | Republican
| 1972
| Incumbent re-elected.
| nowrap | 

|}

Colorado 

|-
! 
| Pat Schroeder
|  | Democratic
| 1972
| Incumbent re-elected.
| nowrap | 

|-
! 
| Tim Wirth
|  | Democratic
| 1974
| Incumbent re-elected.
| nowrap | 

|-
! 
| Frank Evans
|  | Democratic
| 1964
| Incumbent re-elected.
| nowrap | 

|-
! 
| James Paul Johnson
|  | Republican
| 1972
| Incumbent re-elected.
| nowrap | 

|-
! 
| William L. Armstrong
|  | Republican
| 1972
| Incumbent re-elected.
| nowrap | 

|}

Connecticut 

|-
! 
| William R. Cotter
|  | Democratic
| 1970
| Incumbent re-elected.
| nowrap | 

|-
! 
| Chris Dodd
|  | Democratic
| 1974
| Incumbent re-elected.
| nowrap | 

|-
! 
| Robert Giaimo
|  | Democratic
| 1958
| Incumbent re-elected.
| nowrap | 

|-
! 
| Stewart McKinney
|  | Republican
| 1970
| Incumbent re-elected.
| nowrap | 

|-
! 
| Ronald A. Sarasin
|  | Republican
| 1972
| Incumbent re-elected.
| nowrap | 

|-
! 
| Toby Moffett
|  | Democratic
| 1974
| Incumbent re-elected.
| nowrap | 

|}

Delaware 

|-
! 
| Pete du Pont
|  | Republican
| 1970
|  | Incumbent retired to run for Governor of Delaware.New member elected.Republican hold.
| nowrap | 

|}

Florida 

|-
! 
| Bob Sikes
|  | Democratic
| 19401944 1974
| Incumbent re-elected.
| nowrap | 

|-
! 
| Don Fuqua
|  | Democratic
| 1962
| Incumbent re-elected.
| nowrap | 

|-
! 
| Charles E. Bennett
|  | Democratic
| 1948
| Incumbent re-elected.
| nowrap | 

|-
! 
| Bill Chappell
|  | Democratic
| 1968
| Incumbent re-elected.
| nowrap | 

|-
! 
| Richard Kelly
|  | Republican
| 1974
| Incumbent re-elected.
| nowrap | 

|-
! 
| Bill Young
|  | Republican
| 1970
| Incumbent re-elected.
| nowrap | 

|-
! 
| Sam Gibbons
|  | Democratic
| 1962
| Incumbent re-elected.
| nowrap | 

|-
! 
| James A. Haley
|  | Democratic
| 1952
|  | Incumbent retired.New member elected.Democratic hold.
| nowrap | 

|-
! 
| Louis Frey Jr.
|  | Republican
| 1968
| Incumbent re-elected.
| nowrap | 

|-
! 
| Skip Bafalis
|  | Republican
| 1972
| Incumbent re-elected.
| nowrap | 

|-
! 
| Paul Rogers
|  | Democratic
| 1954
| Incumbent re-elected.
| nowrap | 

|-
! 
| J. Herbert Burke
|  | Republican
| 1966
| Incumbent re-elected.
| nowrap | 

|-
! 
| William Lehman
|  | Democratic
| 1972
| Incumbent re-elected.
| nowrap | 

|-
! 
| Claude Pepper
|  | Democratic
| 1962
| Incumbent re-elected.
| nowrap | 

|-
! 
| Dante Fascell
|  | Democratic
| 1954
| Incumbent re-elected.
| nowrap | 

|}

Georgia 

|-
! 
| Ronald "Bo" Ginn
|  | Democratic
| 1972
| Incumbent re-elected.
| nowrap | 

|-
! 
| Dawson Mathis
|  | Democratic
| 1970
| Incumbent re-elected.
| nowrap | 

|-
! 
| Jack Brinkley
|  | Democratic
| 1966
| Incumbent re-elected.
| nowrap | 

|-
! 
| Elliott H. Levitas
|  | Democratic
| 1974
| Incumbent re-elected.
| nowrap | 

|-
! 
| Andrew Young
|  | Democratic
| 1972
| Incumbent re-elected.
| nowrap | 

|-
! 
| John Flynt
|  | Democratic
| 1954
| Incumbent re-elected.
| nowrap | 

|-
! 
| Larry McDonald
|  | Democratic
| 1974
| Incumbent re-elected.
| nowrap | 

|-
! 
| W. S. Stuckey Jr.
|  | Democratic
| 1966
|  | Incumbent retired.New member elected.Democratic hold.
| nowrap | 

|-
! 
| Phillip M. Landrum
|  | Democratic
| 1952
|  | Incumbent retired.New member elected.Democratic hold.
| nowrap | 

|-
! 
| Robert Grier Stephens Jr.
|  | Democratic
| 1960
|  | Incumbent retired.New member elected.Democratic hold.
| nowrap | 

|}

Hawaii 

|-
! 
| Spark Matsunaga
|  | Democratic
| 1962
|  | Incumbent retired to run for U.S. senator.New member elected.Democratic hold.
| nowrap | 

|-
! 
| Patsy Mink
|  | Democratic
| 1964
|  | Incumbent retired to run for U.S. senator.New member elected.Democratic hold.
| nowrap | 

|}

Idaho 

|-
! 
| Steve Symms
|  | Republican
| 1972
| Incumbent re-elected.
| nowrap | 

|-
! 
| George V. Hansen
|  | Republican
| 19641968 1974
| Incumbent re-elected.
| nowrap | 

|}

Illinois 

|-
! 
| Ralph Metcalfe
|  | Democratic
| 1970
| Incumbent re-elected.
| nowrap | 

|-
! 
| Morgan F. Murphy
|  | Democratic
| 1970
| Incumbent re-elected.
| nowrap | 

|-
! 
| Marty Russo
|  | Democratic
| 1974
| Incumbent re-elected.
| nowrap | 

|-
! 
| Ed Derwinski
|  | Republican
| 1958
| Incumbent re-elected.
| nowrap | 

|-
! 
| John G. Fary
|  | Democratic
| 1975
| Incumbent re-elected.
| nowrap | 

|-
! 
| Henry Hyde
|  | Republican
| 1974
| Incumbent re-elected.
| nowrap | 

|-
! 
| Cardiss Collins
|  | Democratic
| 1973
| Incumbent re-elected.
| nowrap | 

|-
! 
| Dan Rostenkowski
|  | Democratic
| 1958
| Incumbent re-elected.
| nowrap | 

|-
! 
| Sidney R. Yates
|  | Democratic
| 19481962 1964
| Incumbent re-elected.
| nowrap | 

|-
! 
| Abner Mikva
|  | Democratic
| 19681972 1974
| Incumbent re-elected.
| nowrap | 

|-
! 
| Frank Annunzio
|  | Democratic
| 1964
| Incumbent re-elected.
| nowrap | 

|-
! 
| Phil Crane
|  | Republican
| 1969
| Incumbent re-elected.
| nowrap | 

|-
! 
| Robert McClory
|  | Republican
| 1962
| Incumbent re-elected.
| nowrap | 

|-
! 
| John N. Erlenborn
|  | Republican
| 1964
| Incumbent re-elected.
| nowrap | 

|-
! 
| Tim Lee Hall
|  | Democratic
| 1974
|  | Lost re-electionRepublican gain.
| nowrap | 

|-
! 
| John B. Anderson
|  | Republican
| 1960
| Incumbent re-elected.
| nowrap | 

|-
! 
| George M. O'Brien
|  | Republican
| 1972
| Incumbent re-elected.
| nowrap | 

|-
! 
| Robert H. Michel
|  | Republican
| 1956
| Incumbent re-elected.
| nowrap | 

|-
! 
| Tom Railsback
|  | Republican
| 1966
| Incumbent re-elected.
| nowrap | 

|-
! 
| Paul Findley
|  | Republican
| 1960
| Incumbent re-elected.
| nowrap | 

|-
! 
| Edward Rell Madigan
|  | Republican
| 1972
| Incumbent re-elected.
| nowrap | 

|-
! 
| George E. Shipley
|  | Democratic
| 1958
| Incumbent re-elected.
| nowrap | 

|-
! 
| Melvin Price
|  | Democratic
| 1944
| Incumbent re-elected.
| nowrap | 

|-
! 
| Paul Simon
|  | Democratic
| 1974
| Incumbent re-elected.
| nowrap | 

|}

Indiana 

|-
! 
| Ray Madden
|  | Democratic
| 1942
|  | Lost renominationDemocratic hold.
| nowrap | 

|-
! 
| Floyd Fithian
|  | Democratic
| 1974
| Incumbent re-elected.
| nowrap | 

|-
! 
| John Brademas
|  | Democratic
| 1958
| Incumbent re-elected.
| nowrap | 

|-
! 
| J. Edward Roush
|  | Democratic
| 19581968 1970
|  | Lost re-electionRepublican gain.
| nowrap | 

|-
! 
| Elwood Hillis
|  | Republican
| 1970
| Incumbent re-elected.
| nowrap | 

|-
! 
| David W. Evans
|  | Democratic
| 1974
| Incumbent re-elected.
| nowrap | 

|-
! 
| John T. Myers
|  | Republican
| 1966
| Incumbent re-elected.
| nowrap | 

|-
! 
| Philip H. Hayes
|  | Democratic
| 1974
|  | Incumbent retired to run for U.S. senator.New member elected.Democratic hold.
| nowrap | 

|-
! 
| Lee H. Hamilton
|  | Democratic
| 1964
| Incumbent re-elected.
| nowrap | 

|-
! 
| Philip Sharp
|  | Democratic
| 1974
| Incumbent re-elected.
| nowrap | 

|-
! 
| Andrew Jacobs Jr.
|  | Democratic
| 19641972 1974
| Incumbent re-elected.
| nowrap | 

|}

Iowa 

|-
! 
| Edward Mezvinsky
|  | Democratic
| 1972
|  | Lost re-electionRepublican gain.
| nowrap | 

|-
! 
| Mike Blouin
|  | Democratic
| 1974
| Incumbent re-elected.
| nowrap | 

|-
! 
| Chuck Grassley
|  | Republican
| 1974
| Incumbent re-elected.
| nowrap | 

|-
! 
| Neal Edward Smith
|  | Democratic
| 1958
| Incumbent re-elected.
| nowrap | 

|-
! 
| Tom Harkin
|  | Democratic
| 1974
| Incumbent re-elected.
| nowrap | 

|-
! 
| Berkley Bedell
|  | Democratic
| 1974
| Incumbent re-elected.
| nowrap | 

|}

Kansas 

|-
! 
| Keith Sebelius
|  | Republican
| 1968
| Incumbent re-elected.
| nowrap | 

|-
! 
| Martha Keys
|  | Democratic
| 1974
| Incumbent re-elected.
| nowrap | 

|-
! 
| Larry Winn
|  | Republican
| 1966
| Incumbent re-elected.
| nowrap | 

|-
! 
| Garner E. Shriver
|  | Republican
| 1960
|  | Lost re-electionDemocratic gain.
| nowrap | 

|-
! 
| Joe Skubitz
|  | Republican
| 1962
| Incumbent re-elected.
| nowrap | 

|}

Kentucky 

|-
! 
| Carroll Hubbard
|  | Democratic
| 1974
| Incumbent re-elected.
| nowrap | 

|-
! 
| William Natcher
|  | Democratic
| 1953 
| Incumbent re-elected.
| nowrap | 

|-
! 
| Romano Mazzoli
|  | Democratic
| 1970
| Incumbent re-elected.
| nowrap | 

|-
! 
| Gene Snyder
|  | Republican
| 19621964 1966
| Incumbent re-elected.
| nowrap | 

|-
! 
| Tim Lee Carter
|  | Republican
| 1964
| Incumbent re-elected.
| nowrap | 

|-
! 
| John B. Breckinridge
|  | Democratic
| 1972
| Incumbent re-elected.
| nowrap | 

|-
! 
| Carl D. Perkins
|  | Democratic
| 1948
| Incumbent re-elected.
| nowrap | 

|}

Louisiana 

|-
! 
| F. Edward Hébert
|  | Democratic
| 1940
|  | Incumbent retired.New member elected.Democratic hold.
| nowrap | 

|-
! 
| Lindy Boggs
|  | Democratic
| 1973
| Incumbent re-elected.
| nowrap | 

|-
! 
| Dave Treen
|  | Republican
| 1972
| Incumbent re-elected.
| nowrap | 

|-
! 
| Joe Waggonner
|  | Democratic
| 1961
| Incumbent re-elected.
| nowrap | 

|-
! 
| Otto Passman
|  | Democratic
| 1946
|  | Lost renominationDemocratic hold.
| nowrap | 

|-
! 
| Henson Moore
|  | Republican
| 1974
| Incumbent re-elected.
| nowrap | 

|-
! 
| John Breaux
|  | Democratic
| 1972
| Incumbent re-elected.
| nowrap | 

|-
! 
| Gillis William Long
|  | Democratic
| 19621964 1972
| Incumbent re-elected.
| nowrap | 

|}

Maine 

|-
! 
| David F. Emery
|  | Republican
| 1974
| Incumbent re-elected.
| nowrap | 

|-
! 
| William Cohen
|  | Republican
| 1972
| Incumbent re-elected.
| nowrap | 

|}

Maryland 

|-
! 
| Robert Bauman
|  | Republican
| 1973
| Incumbent re-elected.
| nowrap | 

|-
! 
| Clarence Long
|  | Democratic
| 1962
| Incumbent re-elected.
| nowrap | 

|-
! 
| Paul Sarbanes
|  | Democratic
| 1970
|  | Incumbent retired to run for U.S. senator.New member elected.Democratic hold.
| nowrap | 

|-
! 
| Marjorie Holt
|  | Republican
| 1972
| Incumbent re-elected.
| nowrap | 

|-
! 
| Gladys Spellman
|  | Democratic
| 1974
| Incumbent re-elected.
| nowrap | 

|-
! 
| Goodloe Byron
|  | Democratic
| 1970
| Incumbent re-elected.
| nowrap | 

|-
! 
| Parren Mitchell
|  | Democratic
| 1970
| Incumbent re-elected.
| nowrap | 

|-
! 
| Gilbert Gude
|  | Republican
| 1966
|  | Incumbent retired.New member elected.Republican hold.
| nowrap | 

|}

Massachusetts 

|-
! 
| Silvio O. Conte
|  | Republican
| 1958
| Incumbent re-elected.
| nowrap | 

|-
! 
| Edward Boland
|  | Democratic
| 1952
| Incumbent re-elected.
| nowrap | 

|-
! 
| Joseph D. Early
|  | Democratic
| 1974
| Incumbent re-elected.
| nowrap | 

|-
! 
| Robert Drinan
|  | Democratic
| 1970
| Incumbent re-elected.
| nowrap | 

|-
! 
| Paul Tsongas
|  | Democratic
| 1974
| Incumbent re-elected.
| nowrap | 

|-
! 
| Michael J. Harrington
|  | Democratic
| 1969
| Incumbent re-elected.
| nowrap | 

|-
! 
| Torbert Macdonald
|  | Democratic
| 1954
|  | Incumbent died May 21, 1976.New member elected.Democratic hold.Winner was also elected to finish the term, see above.
| nowrap | 

|-
! 
| Tip O'Neill
|  | Democratic
| 1952
| Incumbent re-elected.
| nowrap | 

|-
! 
| Joe Moakley
|  | Democratic
| 1972
| Incumbent re-elected.
| nowrap | 

|-
! 
| Margaret Heckler
|  | Republican
| 1966
| Incumbent re-elected.
| nowrap | 

|-
! 
| James A. Burke
|  | Democratic
| 1958
| Incumbent re-elected.
| nowrap | 

|-
! 
| Gerry Studds
|  | Democratic
| 1972
| Incumbent re-elected.
| nowrap | 

|}

Michigan 

|-
! 
| John Conyers Jr.
|  | Democratic
| 1964
| Incumbent re-elected.
| nowrap | 

|-
! 
| Marvin L. Esch
|  | Republican
| 1966
|  | Incumbent retired to run for U.S. senator.New member elected.Republican hold.
| nowrap | 

|-
! 
| Garry E. Brown
|  | Republican
| 1966
| Incumbent re-elected.
| nowrap | 

|-
! 
| J. Edward Hutchinson
|  | Republican
| 1962
|  | Incumbent retired.New member elected.Republican hold.
| nowrap | 

|-
! 
| Richard F. Vander Veen
|  | Democratic
| 1974
|  | Lost re-electionRepublican gain.
| nowrap | 

|-
! 
| Milton Robert Carr
|  | Democratic
| 1974
| Incumbent re-elected.
| nowrap | 

|-
! 
| Donald Riegle
|  | Democratic
| 1966
|  | Incumbent retired to run for U.S. senator.New member elected.Democratic hold.
| nowrap | 

|-
! 
| J. Bob Traxler
|  | Democratic
| 1974
| Incumbent re-elected.
| nowrap | 

|-
! 
| Guy Vander Jagt
|  | Republican
| 1966
| Incumbent re-elected.
| nowrap | 

|-
! 
| Elford Albin Cederberg
|  | Republican
| 1952
| Incumbent re-elected.
| nowrap | 

|-
! 
| Philip Ruppe
|  | Republican
| 1966
| Incumbent re-elected.
| nowrap | 

|-
! 
| James G. O'Hara
|  | Democratic
| 1958
|  | Incumbent retired to run for U.S. senator.New member elected.Democratic hold.
| nowrap | 

|-
! 
| Charles Diggs
|  | Democratic
| 1954
| Incumbent re-elected.
| nowrap | 

|-
! 
| Lucien Nedzi
|  | Democratic
| 1961
| Incumbent re-elected.
| nowrap | 

|-
! 
| William D. Ford
|  | Democratic
| 1964
| Incumbent re-elected.
| nowrap | 

|-
! 
| John D. Dingell Jr.
|  | Democratic
| 1955
| Incumbent re-elected.
| nowrap | 

|-
! 
| William M. Brodhead
|  | Democratic
| 1974
| Incumbent re-elected.
| nowrap | 

|-
! 
| James J. Blanchard
|  | Democratic
| 1974
| Incumbent re-elected.
| nowrap | 

|-
! 
| William Broomfield
|  | Republican
| 1956
| Incumbent re-elected.
| nowrap | 

|}

Minnesota 

|-
! 
| Al Quie
|  | Republican
| 1958
| Incumbent re-elected.
| nowrap | 

|-
! 
| Tom Hagedorn
|  | Republican
| 1974
| Incumbent re-elected.
| nowrap | 

|-
! 
| Bill Frenzel
|  | Republican
| 1970
| Incumbent re-elected.
| nowrap | 

|-
! 
| Joseph Karth
|  | Democratic
| 1958
|  | Incumbent retired.New member elected.Democratic hold.
| nowrap | 

|-
! 
| Donald M. Fraser
|  | Democratic
| 1962
| Incumbent re-elected.
| nowrap | 

|-
! 
| Rick Nolan
|  | Democratic
| 1974
| Incumbent re-elected.
| nowrap | 

|-
! 
| Bob Bergland
|  | Democratic
| 1970
| Incumbent re-elected.
| nowrap | 

|-
! 
| Jim Oberstar
|  | Democratic
| 1974
| Incumbent re-elected.
| nowrap | 

|}

Mississippi 

|-
! 
| Jamie Whitten
|  | Democratic
| 1941
| Incumbent re-elected.
| nowrap | 

|-
! 
| David R. Bowen
|  | Democratic
| 1972
| Incumbent re-elected.
| nowrap | 

|-
! 
| Sonny Montgomery
|  | Democratic
| 1966
| Incumbent re-elected.
| nowrap | 

|-
! 
| Thad Cochran
|  | Republican
| 1972
| Incumbent re-elected.
| nowrap | 

|-
! 
| Trent Lott
|  | Republican
| 1972
| Incumbent re-elected.
| nowrap | 

|}

Missouri 

|-
! 
| Bill Clay
|  | Democratic
| 1968
| Incumbent re-elected.
| nowrap | 

|-
! 
| James W. Symington
|  | Democratic
| 1968
|  | Incumbent retired to run for U.S. senator.New member elected.Democratic hold.
| nowrap | 

|-
! 
| Leonor Sullivan
|  | Democratic
| 1952
|  | Incumbent retired.New member elected.Democratic hold.
| nowrap | 

|-
! 
| William J. Randall
|  | Democratic
| 1959
|  | Incumbent retired.New member elected.Democratic hold.
| nowrap | 

|-
! 
| Richard Bolling
|  | Democratic
| 1948
| Incumbent re-elected.
| nowrap | 

|-
! 
| Jerry Litton
|  | Democratic
| 1972
|  | Incumbent died.New member elected.Republican gain.
| nowrap | 

|-
! 
| Gene Taylor
|  | Republican
| 1972
| Incumbent re-elected.
| nowrap | 

|-
! 
| Richard Howard Ichord Jr.
|  | Democratic
| 1960
| Incumbent re-elected.
| nowrap | 

|-
! 
| William L. Hungate
|  | Democratic
| 1964
|  | Incumbent retired.New member elected.Democratic hold.
| nowrap | 

|-
! 
| Bill Burlison
|  | Democratic
| 1968
| Incumbent re-elected.
| nowrap | 

|}

Montana 

|-
! 
| Max Baucus
|  | Democratic
| 1974
| Incumbent re-elected.
| nowrap | 

|-
! 
| John Melcher
|  | Democratic
| 1969
|  | Incumbent retired to run for U.S. senator.New member elected.Republican gain.
| nowrap | 

|}

Nebraska 

|-
! 
| Charles Thone
|  | Republican
| 1970
| Incumbent re-elected.
| nowrap | 

|-
! 
| John Y. McCollister
|  | Republican
| 1970
|  | Incumbent retired to run for U.S. senator.New member elected.Democratic gain.
| nowrap | 

|-
! 
| Virginia D. Smith
|  | Republican
| 1974
| Incumbent re-elected.
| nowrap | 

|}

Nevada 

|-
! 
| James David Santini
|  | Democratic
| 1974
| Incumbent re-elected.
| nowrap | 

|}

New Hampshire 

|-
! 
| Norman D'Amours
|  | Democratic
| 1974
| Incumbent re-elected.
| nowrap | 

|-
! 
| James Colgate Cleveland
|  | Republican
| 1962
| Incumbent re-elected.
| nowrap | 

|}

New Jersey 

|-
! 
| James Florio
|  | Democratic
| 1974
| Incumbent re-elected.
| nowrap | 

|-
! 
| William J. Hughes
|  | Democratic
| 1974
| Incumbent re-elected.
| nowrap | 

|-
! 
| James J. Howard
|  | Democratic
| 1964
| Incumbent re-elected.
| nowrap | 

|-
! 
| Frank Thompson
|  | Democratic
| 1954
| Incumbent re-elected.
| nowrap | 

|-
! 
| Millicent Fenwick
|  | Republican
| 1974
| Incumbent re-elected.
| nowrap | 

|-
! 
| Edwin B. Forsythe
|  | Republican
| 1970
| Incumbent re-elected.
| nowrap | 

|-
! 
| Andrew Maguire
|  | Democratic
| 1974
| Incumbent re-elected.
| nowrap | 

|-
! 
| Robert A. Roe
|  | Democratic
| 1970
| Incumbent re-elected.
| nowrap | 

|-
! 
| Henry Helstoski
|  | Democratic
| 1964
|  | Lost re-electionRepublican gain.
| nowrap | 

|-
! 
| Peter W. Rodino
|  | Democratic
| 1948
| Incumbent re-elected.
| nowrap | 

|-
! 
| Joseph Minish
|  | Democratic
| 1962
| Incumbent re-elected.
| nowrap | 

|-
! 
| Matthew John Rinaldo
|  | Republican
| 1972
| Incumbent re-elected.
| nowrap | 

|-
! 
| Helen Meyner
|  | Democratic
| 1974
| Incumbent re-elected.
| nowrap | 

|-
! 
| Dominick V. Daniels
|  | Democratic
| 1958
|  | Incumbent retired.New member elected.Democratic hold.
| nowrap | 

|-
! 
| Edward J. Patten
|  | Democratic
| 1962
| Incumbent re-elected.
| nowrap | 

|}

New Mexico 

|-
! 
| Manuel Lujan Jr.
|  | Republican
| 1968
| Incumbent re-elected.
| 

|-
! 
| Harold L. Runnels
|  | Democratic
| 1970
| Incumbent re-elected.
| 

|}

New York 

|-
! 
| Otis G. Pike
|  | Democratic
| 1960
| Incumbent re-elected.
| nowrap | 

|-
! 
| Thomas J. Downey
|  | Democratic
| 1974
| Incumbent re-elected.
| nowrap | 

|-
! 
| Jerome Ambro
|  | Democratic
| 1974
| Incumbent re-elected.
| nowrap | 

|-
! 
| Norman F. Lent
|  | Republican
| 1970
| Incumbent re-elected.
| nowrap | 

|-
! 
| John W. Wydler
|  | Republican
| 1962
| Incumbent re-elected.
| nowrap | 

|-
! 
| Lester L. Wolff
|  | Democratic
| 1964
| Incumbent re-elected.
| nowrap | 

|-
! 
| Joseph P. Addabbo
|  | Democratic
| 1960
| Incumbent re-elected.
| nowrap | 

|-
! 
| Benjamin Stanley Rosenthal
|  | Democratic
| 1962
| Incumbent re-elected.
| nowrap | 

|-
! 
| James J. Delaney
|  | Democratic
| 19441946 1948
| Incumbent re-elected.
| nowrap | 

|-
! 
| Mario Biaggi
|  | Democratic
| 1968
| Incumbent re-elected.
| nowrap | 

|-
! 
| James H. Scheuer
|  | Democratic
| 19641972 1974
| Incumbent re-elected.
| nowrap | 

|-
! 
| Shirley Chisholm
|  | Democratic
| 1968
| Incumbent re-elected.
| nowrap | 

|-
! 
| Stephen J. Solarz
|  | Democratic
| 1974
| Incumbent re-elected.
| nowrap | 

|-
! 
| Fred Richmond
|  | Democratic
| 1974
| Incumbent re-elected.
| nowrap | 

|-
! 
| Leo C. Zeferetti
|  | Democratic
| 1974
| Incumbent re-elected.
| nowrap | 

|-
! 
| Elizabeth Holtzman
|  | Democratic
| 1972
| Incumbent re-elected.
| nowrap | 

|-
! 
| John M. Murphy
|  | Democratic
| 1962
| Incumbent re-elected.
| nowrap | 

|-
! 
| Ed Koch
|  | Democratic
| 1968
| Incumbent re-elected.
| nowrap | 

|-
! 
| Charles B. Rangel
|  | Democratic
| 1970
| Incumbent re-elected.
| nowrap | 

|-
! 
| Bella Abzug
|  | Democratic
| 1970
|  | Incumbent retired to run for U.S. senator.New member elected.Democratic hold.
| nowrap | 

|-
! 
| Herman Badillo
|  | Democratic
| 1970
| Incumbent re-elected.
| nowrap | 

|-
! 
| Jonathan Brewster Bingham
|  | Democratic
| 1964
| Incumbent re-elected.
| nowrap | 

|-
! 
| Peter A. Peyser
|  | Republican
| 1970
|  | Incumbent retired to run for U.S. senator.New member elected.Republican hold.
| nowrap | 

|-
! 
| Richard Ottinger
|  | Democratic
| 19641970 1974
| Incumbent re-elected.
| nowrap | 

|-
! 
| Hamilton Fish IV
|  | Republican
| 1968
| Incumbent re-elected.
| nowrap | 

|-
! 
| Benjamin A. Gilman
|  | Republican
| 1972
| Incumbent re-elected.
| nowrap | 

|-
! 
| Matthew F. McHugh
|  | Democratic
| 1974
| Incumbent re-elected.
| nowrap | 

|-
! 
| Samuel S. Stratton
|  | Democratic
| 1958
| Incumbent re-elected.
| nowrap | 

|-
! 
| Edward W. Pattison
|  | Democratic
| 1974
| Incumbent re-elected.
| nowrap | 

|-
! 
| Robert C. McEwen
|  | Republican
| 1964
| Incumbent re-elected.
| nowrap | 

|-
! 
| Donald J. Mitchell
|  | Republican
| 1972
| Incumbent re-elected.
| nowrap | 

|-
! 
| James M. Hanley
|  | Democratic
| 1964
| Incumbent re-elected.
| nowrap | 

|-
! 
| William F. Walsh
|  | Republican
| 1972
| Incumbent re-elected.
| nowrap | 

|-
! 
| Frank Horton
|  | Republican
| 1962
| Incumbent re-elected.
| nowrap | 

|-
! 
| Barber Conable
|  | Republican
| 1964
| Incumbent re-elected.
| nowrap | 

|-
! 
| John J. LaFalce
|  | Democratic
| 1974
| Incumbent re-elected.
| nowrap | 

|-
! 
| Henry J. Nowak
|  | Democratic
| 1974
| Incumbent re-elected.
| nowrap | 

|-
! 
| Jack Kemp
|  | Republican
| 1970
| Incumbent re-elected.
| nowrap | 

|-
! 
| Stan Lundine
|  | Democratic
| 1976
| Incumbent re-elected.
| nowrap | 

|}

North Carolina 

|-
! 
| Walter B. Jones Sr.
|  | Democratic
| 1966
| Incumbent re-elected.
| nowrap | 

|-
! 
| Lawrence H. Fountain
|  | Democratic
| 1952
| Incumbent re-elected.
| nowrap | 

|-
! 
| David N. Henderson
|  | Democratic
| 1960
|  | Incumbent retired.New member elected.Democratic hold.
| nowrap | 

|-
! 
| Ike Franklin Andrews
|  | Democratic
| 1972
| Incumbent re-elected.
| nowrap | 

|-
! 
| Stephen L. Neal
|  | Democratic
| 1974
| Incumbent re-elected.
| nowrap | 

|-
! 
| L. Richardson Preyer
|  | Democratic
| 1968
| Incumbent re-elected.
| nowrap | 

|-
! 
| Charlie Rose
|  | Democratic
| 1972
| Incumbent re-elected.
| nowrap | 

|-
! 
| Bill Hefner
|  | Democratic
| 1974
| Incumbent re-elected.
| nowrap | 

|-
! 
| James G. Martin
|  | Republican
| 1972
| Incumbent re-elected.
| nowrap | 

|-
! 
| Jim Broyhill
|  | Republican
| 1962
| Incumbent re-elected.
| nowrap | 

|-
! 
| Roy A. Taylor
|  | Democratic
| 1960
|  | Incumbent retired.New member elected.Democratic hold.
| nowrap | 

|}

North Dakota 

|-
! 
| Mark Andrews
|  | Republican
| 1963
| Incumbent re-elected.
| nowrap | 

|}

Ohio 

|-
! 
| Bill Gradison
|  | Republican
| 1974
| Incumbent re-elected.
| nowrap | 

|-
! 
| Donald D. Clancy
|  | Republican
| 1960
|  | Lost re-electionDemocratic gain.
| nowrap | 

|-
! 
| Charles W. Whalen Jr.
|  | Republican
| 1966
| Incumbent re-elected.
| nowrap | 

|-
! 
| Tennyson Guyer
|  | Republican
| 1972
| Incumbent re-elected.
| nowrap | 

|-
! 
| Del Latta
|  | Republican
| 1958
| Incumbent re-elected.
| nowrap | 

|-
! 
| Bill Harsha
|  | Republican
| 1960
| Incumbent re-elected.
| nowrap | 

|-
! 
| Bud Brown
|  | Republican
| 1965
| Incumbent re-elected.
| nowrap | 

|-
! 
| Tom Kindness
|  | Republican
| 1974
| Incumbent re-elected.
| nowrap | 

|-
! 
| Thomas L. Ashley
|  | Democratic
| 1954
| Incumbent re-elected.
| nowrap | 

|-
! 
| Clarence E. Miller
|  | Republican
| 1966
| Incumbent re-elected.
| nowrap | 

|-
! 
| J. William Stanton
|  | Republican
| 1964
| Incumbent re-elected.
| nowrap | 

|-
! 
| Samuel L. Devine
|  | Republican
| 1958
| Incumbent re-elected.
| nowrap | 

|-
! 
| Charles Adams Mosher
|  | Republican
| 1960
|  | Incumbent retired.New member elected.Democratic gain.
| nowrap | 

|-
! 
| John F. Seiberling
|  | Democratic
| 1970
| Incumbent re-elected.
| nowrap | 

|-
! 
| Chalmers Wylie
|  | Republican
| 1966
| Incumbent re-elected.
| nowrap | 

|-
! 
| Ralph Regula
|  | Republican
| 1972
| Incumbent re-elected.
| nowrap | 

|-
! 
| John M. Ashbrook
|  | Republican
| 1960
| Incumbent re-elected.
| nowrap | 

|-
! 
| Wayne Hays
|  | Democratic
| 1948
|  | Incumbent resigned.New member elected.Democratic hold.
| nowrap | 

|-
! 
| Charles J. Carney
|  | Democratic
| 1970
| Incumbent re-elected.
| nowrap | 

|-
! 
| James V. Stanton
|  | Democratic
| 1970
|  | Incumbent retired to run for U.S. senator.New member elected.Democratic hold.
| nowrap | 

|-
! 
| Louis Stokes
|  | Democratic
| 1968
| Incumbent re-elected.
| nowrap | 

|-
! 
| Charles Vanik
|  | Democratic
| 1954
| Incumbent re-elected.
| nowrap | 

|-
! 
| Ronald M. Mottl
|  | Democratic
| 1974
| Incumbent re-elected.
| nowrap | 

|}

Oklahoma 

|-
! 
| James R. Jones
|  | Democratic
| 1972
| Incumbent re-elected.
| nowrap | 

|-
! 
| Ted Risenhoover
|  | Democratic
| 1974
| Incumbent re-elected.
| nowrap | 

|-
! 
| Carl Albert
|  | Democratic
| 1946
|  | Incumbent retired.New member elected.Democratic hold.
| nowrap | 

|-
! 
| Tom Steed
|  | Democratic
| 1948
| Incumbent re-elected.
| nowrap | 

|-
! 
| John Jarman
|  | Republican
| 1950
|  | Incumbent retired.New member elected.Republican hold.
| nowrap | 

|-
! 
| Glenn English
|  | Democratic
| 1974
| Incumbent re-elected.
| nowrap | 

|}

Oregon 

|-
! 
| Les AuCoin
|  | Democratic
| 1974
| Incumbent re-elected.
| nowrap | 

|-
! 
| Al Ullman
|  | Democratic
| 1956
| Incumbent re-elected.
| nowrap | 

|-
! 
| Robert B. Duncan
|  | Democratic
| 19621966 1974
| Incumbent re-elected.
| nowrap | 

|-
! 
| Jim Weaver
|  | Democratic
| 1974
| Incumbent re-elected.
| nowrap | 

|}

Pennsylvania 

|-
! 
| William A. Barrett
|  | Democratic
| 19441946 1948
|  | Incumbent died.New member elected.Democratic hold.
| nowrap | 

|-
! 
| Robert N. C. Nix Sr.
|  | Democratic
| 1958
| Incumbent re-elected.
| nowrap | 

|-
! 
| William J. Green III
|  | Democratic
| 1964
|  | Incumbent retired to run for U.S. senator.New member elected.Democratic hold.
| nowrap | 

|-
! 
| Joshua Eilberg
|  | Democratic
| 1966
| Incumbent re-elected.
| nowrap | 

|-
! 
| Richard T. Schulze
|  | Republican
| 1974
| Incumbent re-elected.
| nowrap | 

|-
! 
| Gus Yatron
|  | Democratic
| 1968
| Incumbent re-elected.
| nowrap | 

|-
! 
| Robert W. Edgar
|  | Democratic
| 1974
| Incumbent re-elected.
| nowrap | 

|-
! 
| Edward G. Biester Jr.
|  | Republican
| 1966
|  | Incumbent retired.New member elected.Democratic gain.
| nowrap | 

|-
! 
| Bud Shuster
|  | Republican
| 1972
| Incumbent re-elected.
| nowrap | 

|-
! 
| Joseph M. McDade
|  | Republican
| 1962
| Incumbent re-elected.
| nowrap | 

|-
! 
| Dan Flood
|  | Democratic
| 19441946 19481952 1954
| Incumbent re-elected.
| nowrap | 

|-
! 
| John Murtha
|  | Democratic
| 1974
| Incumbent re-elected.
| nowrap | 

|-
! 
| Lawrence Coughlin
|  | Republican
| 1968
| Incumbent re-elected.
| nowrap | 

|-
! 
| William S. Moorhead
|  | Democratic
| 1958
| Incumbent re-elected.
| nowrap | 

|-
! 
| Fred B. Rooney
|  | Democratic
| 1963
| Incumbent re-elected.
| nowrap | 

|-
! 
| Edwin D. Eshleman
|  | Republican
| 1966
|  | Incumbent retired.New member elected.Republican hold.
| nowrap | 

|-
! 
| Herman T. Schneebeli
|  | Republican
| 1960
|  | Incumbent retired.New member elected.Democratic gain.
| nowrap | 

|-
! 
| John Heinz
|  | Republican
| 1971
|  | Incumbent retired to run for U.S. senator.New member elected.Democratic gain.
| nowrap | 

|-
! 
| William F. Goodling
|  | Republican
| 1974
| Incumbent re-elected.
| nowrap | 

|-
! 
| Joseph M. Gaydos
|  | Democratic
| 1968
| Incumbent re-elected.
| nowrap | 

|-
! 
| John Herman Dent
|  | Democratic
| 1958
| Incumbent re-elected.
| nowrap | 

|-
! 
| Thomas E. Morgan
|  | Democratic
| 1944
|  | Incumbent retired.New member elected.Democratic hold.
| nowrap | 

|-
! 
| Albert W. Johnson
|  | Republican
| 1963
|  | Lost re-electionDemocratic gain.
| nowrap | 

|-
! 
| Joseph P. Vigorito
|  | Democratic
| 1964
|  | Lost re-electionRepublican gain.
| nowrap | 

|-
! 
| Gary A. Myers
|  | Republican
| 1974
| Incumbent re-elected.
| nowrap | 

|}

Rhode Island 

|-
! 
| Fernand St. Germain
|  | Democratic
| 1960
| Incumbent re-elected.
| nowrap | 

|-
! 
| Edward Beard
|  | Democratic
| 1974
| Incumbent re-elected.
| nowrap | 

|}

South Carolina 

|-
! 
| Mendel Jackson Davis
|  | Democratic
| 1971
| Incumbent re-elected.
| nowrap | 

|-
! 
| Floyd Spence
|  | Republican
| 1970
| Incumbent re-elected.
| nowrap | 

|-
! 
| Butler Derrick
|  | Democratic
| 1974
| Incumbent re-elected.
| nowrap | 

|-
! 
| James Mann
|  | Democratic
| 1968
| Incumbent re-elected.
| nowrap | 

|-
! 
| Kenneth Lamar Holland
|  | Democratic
| 1974
| Incumbent re-elected.
| nowrap | 

|-
! 
| John Jenrette
|  | Democratic
| 1974
| Incumbent re-elected.
| nowrap | 

|}

South Dakota 

|-
! 
| Larry Pressler
|  | Republican
| 1974
| Incumbent re-elected.
| nowrap | 

|-
! 
| James Abdnor
|  | Republican
| 1972
| Incumbent re-elected.
| nowrap | 

|}

Tennessee 

|-
! 
| Jimmy Quillen
|  | Republican
| 1962
| Incumbent re-elected.
| nowrap | 

|-
! 
| John Duncan Sr.
|  | Republican
| 1964
| Incumbent re-elected.
| nowrap | 

|-
! 
| Marilyn Lloyd
|  | Democratic
| 1974
| Incumbent re-elected.
| nowrap | 

|-
! 
| Joe L. Evins
|  | Democratic
| 1946
|  | Incumbent retired.New member elected.Democratic hold.
| nowrap | 

|-
! 
| Clifford Allen
|  | Democratic
| 1975
| Incumbent re-elected.
| nowrap | 

|-
! 
| Robin Beard
|  | Republican
| 1972
| Incumbent re-elected.
| nowrap | 

|-
! 
| Ed Jones
|  | Democratic
| 1969
| Incumbent re-elected.
| nowrap | 

|-
! 
| Harold Ford Sr.
|  | Democratic
| 1974
| Incumbent re-elected.
| nowrap | 

|}

Texas 

|-
! 
| Sam B. Hall Jr.
|  | Democratic
| 1976
| Incumbent re-elected.
| nowrap | 

|-
! 
| Charles Wilson
|  | Democratic
| 1972
| Incumbent re-elected.
| nowrap | 

|-
! 
| James M. Collins
|  | Republican
| 1968
| Incumbent re-elected.
| nowrap | 

|-
! 
| Ray Roberts
|  | Democratic
| 1962
| Incumbent re-elected.
| nowrap | 

|-
! 
| Alan Steelman
|  | Republican
| 1974
|  | Incumbent retired to run for U.S. senator.New member elected.Democratic gain.
| nowrap | 

|-
! 
| Olin E. Teague
|  | Democratic
| 1946
| Incumbent re-elected.
| nowrap | 

|-
! 
| Bill Archer
|  | Republican
| 1970
| Incumbent re-elected.
| nowrap | 

|-
! 
| Robert C. Eckhardt
|  | Democratic
| 1966
| Incumbent re-elected.
| nowrap | 

|-
! 
| Jack Brooks
|  | Democratic
| 1952
| Incumbent re-elected.
| nowrap | 

|-
! 
| J. J. Pickle
|  | Democratic
| 1963
| Incumbent re-elected.
| nowrap | 

|-
! 
| William R. Poage
|  | Democratic
| 1936
| Incumbent re-elected.
| nowrap | 

|-
! 
| Jim Wright
|  | Democratic
| 1954
| Incumbent re-elected.
| nowrap | 

|-
! 
| Jack Hightower
|  | Democratic
| 1974
| Incumbent re-elected.
| nowrap | 

|-
! 
| John Andrew Young
|  | Democratic
| 1956
| Incumbent re-elected.
| nowrap | 

|-
! 
| Kika de la Garza
|  | Democratic
| 1964
| Incumbent re-elected.
| nowrap | 

|-
! 
| Richard Crawford White
|  | Democratic
| 1964
| Incumbent re-elected.
| nowrap | 

|-
! 
| Omar Burleson
|  | Democratic
| 1946
| Incumbent re-elected.
| nowrap | 

|-
! 
| Barbara Jordan
|  | Democratic
| 1972
| Incumbent re-elected.
| nowrap | 

|-
! 
| George H. Mahon
|  | Democratic
| 1934
| Incumbent re-elected.
| nowrap | 

|-
! 
| Henry B. González
|  | Democratic
| 1961
| Incumbent re-elected.
| nowrap | 

|-
! 
| Bob Krueger
|  | Democratic
| 1974
| Incumbent re-elected.
| nowrap | 

|-
! 
| Ron Paul
|  | Republican
| April 3, 1976(Special)
|  | Lost re-electionDemocratic gain.
| nowrap | 

|-
! 
| Abraham Kazen
|  | Democratic
| 1966
| Incumbent re-elected.
| nowrap | 

|-
! 
| Dale Milford
|  | Democratic
| 1972
| Incumbent re-elected.
| nowrap | 

|}

Utah 

|-
! 
| K. Gunn McKay
|  | Democratic
| 1970
| Incumbent re-elected.
| nowrap | 

|-
! 
| Allan Howe
|  | Democratic
| 1974
|  | Lost re-electionRepublican gain.
| nowrap | 

|}

Vermont 

|-
! 
| Jim Jeffords
|  | Republican
| 1974
| Incumbent re-elected.
| nowrap | 

|}

Virginia 

|-
! 
| Thomas N. Downing
|  | Democratic
| 1958
|  | Incumbent retired.New member elected.Republican gain.
| nowrap | 

|-
! 
| G. William Whitehurst
|  | Republican
| 1968
| Incumbent re-elected.
| nowrap | 

|-
! 
| David E. Satterfield III
|  | Democratic
| 1964
| Incumbent re-elected.
| nowrap | 

|-
! 
| Robert Daniel
|  | Republican
| 1972
| Incumbent re-elected.
| nowrap | 

|-
! 
| Dan Daniel
|  | Democratic
| 1968
| Incumbent re-elected.
| nowrap | 

|-
! 
| M. Caldwell Butler
|  | Republican
| 1972
| Incumbent re-elected.
| nowrap | 

|-
! 
| J. Kenneth Robinson
|  | Republican
| 1970
| Incumbent re-elected.
| nowrap | 

|-
! 
| Herbert Harris
|  | Democratic
| 1974
| Incumbent re-elected.
| nowrap | 

|-
! 
| William C. Wampler
|  | Republican
| 19521954 1966
| Incumbent re-elected.
| nowrap | 

|-
! 
| Joseph L. Fisher
|  | Democratic
| 1974
| Incumbent re-elected.
| nowrap | 

|}

Washington 

|-
! 
| Joel Pritchard
|  | Republican
| 1972
| Incumbent re-elected.
| nowrap | 

|-
! 
| Lloyd Meeds
|  | Democratic
| 1964
| Incumbent re-elected.
| nowrap | 

|-
! 
| Don Bonker
|  | Democratic
| 1974
| Incumbent re-elected.
| nowrap | 

|-
! 
| Mike McCormack
|  | Democratic
| 1970
| Incumbent re-elected.
| nowrap | 

|-
! 
| Tom Foley
|  | Democratic
| 1964
| Incumbent re-elected.
| nowrap | 

|-
! 
| Floyd Hicks
|  | Democratic
| 1964
|  | Incumbent retired.New member elected.Democratic hold.
| nowrap | 

|-
! 
| Brock Adams
|  | Democratic
| 1964
| Incumbent re-elected.
| nowrap | 

|}

West Virginia 

|-
! 
| Bob Mollohan
|  | Democratic
| 19521956 1968
| Incumbent re-elected.
| nowrap | 

|-
! 
| Harley Orrin Staggers
|  | Democratic
| 1948
| Incumbent re-elected.
| nowrap | 

|-
! 
| John M. Slack Jr.
|  | Democratic
| 1958
| Incumbent re-elected.
| nowrap | 

|-
! 
| Ken Hechler
|  | Democratic
| 1958
|  | Incumbent retired to run for governor.New member elected. Democratic hold.
| nowrap | 
|}

Wisconsin 

|-
! 
| Les Aspin
|  | Democratic
| 1970
| Incumbent re-elected.
| nowrap | 

|-
! 
| Robert Kastenmeier
|  | Democratic
| 1958
| Incumbent re-elected.
| nowrap | 

|-
! 
| Alvin Baldus
|  | Democratic
| 1974
| Incumbent re-elected.
| nowrap | 

|-
! 
| Clement J. Zablocki
|  | Democratic
| 1948
| Incumbent re-elected.
| nowrap | 

|-
! 
| Henry S. Reuss
|  | Democratic
| 1954
| Incumbent re-elected.
| nowrap | 

|-
! 
| William A. Steiger
|  | Republican
| 1966
| Incumbent re-elected.
| nowrap | 

|-
! 
| Dave Obey
|  | Democratic
| 1969
| Incumbent re-elected.
| nowrap | 

|-
! 
| Robert John Cornell
|  | Democratic
| 1974
| Incumbent re-elected.
| nowrap | 

|-
! 
| Bob Kasten
|  | Republican
| 1974
| Incumbent re-elected.
| nowrap | 

|}

Wyoming 

|-
! 
| Teno Roncalio
|  | Democratic
| 19641966 1970
| Incumbent re-elected.
| nowrap | 

|}

See also
 1976 United States elections
 1976 United States gubernatorial elections
 1976 United States presidential election
 1976 United States Senate elections
 94th United States Congress
 95th United States Congress

References